Seán Rafferty (born John Dickson Kerr Rafferty; 6 February 1909, in Dumfriesshire, Scotland – 4 December 1993, in Iddesleigh, Devon, England) was a Scottish poet, based in England from 1932 until his death.

Career
Rafferty studied Classics at the University of Edinburgh before moving to England in 1948.

Rafferty's poetic work is squarely within the Anglo-American modernist tradition, reflecting variously the influence of traditional English lyric, Celtic bardic poetry, balladry, and popular song.

Rafferty's poetry has been praised by Sorley MacLean, Ted Hughes, Michael Morpurgo and Hugh MacDiarmid and was posthumously published in collections by the poetry presses Carcanet and Etruscan.

Personal life
The death of Rafferty's first wife, Betty Bryant, in 1945, by whom he had a daughter, figures prominently in his poetry. He married Peggy Laing in 1947 and the next year moved with her to Iddesleigh, Devon, where he was landlord of the Duke Of York Inn. He lived in Iddesleigh until his death in 1993, at the age of 84.

Works

Books 

 Collected Poems, edited by Nicholas Johnson, Manchester: Carcanet, 1995.
 Poems, edited by Nicholas Johnson, Buckfastleigh, South Devonshire : Etruscan Books ; Berkeley, CA : Distributed in America by SPD, 1999.  [Revised and enlarged version of the 1995 Carcanet edition.]
 Poems, Revue Sketches, and Fragments, edited by Nicholas Johnson, Buckfastleigh, South Devonshire : Etruscan Books; Berkeley, CA : Distributed in America by SPD, 2004.

Recordings 

 Various Artists - In Tune with the World: The Poetry of Seán Rafferty (2010 Brown Label Poetry), featuring readings by Jim Causley, Michael and Clare Morpurgo, Carol Hughes, Nicholas Johnson, Jane Fever and Vic Baines.

References

External links
Related article on Official Michael Morpurgo Website
Farms for City Children

People from Dumfries and Galloway
Scottish people of Irish descent
1909 births
1998 deaths
20th-century Scottish poets
Scottish male poets
20th-century British male writers